In additive number theory, the Fermat polygonal number theorem states that every positive integer is a sum of at most  -gonal numbers. That is, every positive integer can be written as the sum of three or fewer triangular numbers, and as the sum of four or fewer square numbers, and as the sum of five or fewer pentagonal numbers, and so on. That is, the -gonal numbers form an additive basis of order .

Examples
Three such representations of the number 17, for example, are shown below:
17 = 10 + 6 + 1 (triangular numbers)
17 = 16 + 1 (square numbers)
17 = 12 + 5 (pentagonal numbers).

History
The theorem is named after Pierre de Fermat, who stated it, in 1638, without proof, promising to write it in a separate work that never appeared.
Joseph Louis Lagrange proved the square case in 1770, which states that every positive number can be represented as a sum of four squares, for example, . Gauss proved the triangular case in 1796,  commemorating the occasion by writing in his diary the line "ΕΥΡΗΚΑ! ", and published a proof in his book Disquisitiones Arithmeticae. For this reason, Gauss's result is sometimes known as the Eureka theorem. The full polygonal number theorem was not resolved until it was finally proven by Cauchy in 1813.

See also
 Pollock's conjectures
 Waring's problem

Notes

References
 
.
.
. Has proofs of Lagrange's theorem and the polygonal number theorem.

Additive number theory
Analytic number theory
Figurate numbers
Theorems in number theory